Tyson Wahl (born February 23, 1984) is an American retired soccer player.

Career

Youth and college
Wahl played club soccer for Slammers FC coached by Walid and Ziad Khoury, and Irvine Strikers, coached by Don Ebert, and played college soccer at the University of California, Berkeley from 2002 to 2005, where he started every game of his career. He also played two seasons with Orange County Blue Star in the USL Premier Development League.

Professional
Wahl was drafted in the second round, 19th overall, by Kansas City Wizards in the 2006 MLS SuperDraft. Wahl went on to make 32 appearances for Kansas City in 3 years. He was taken by Seattle Sounders FC in the 2008 MLS Expansion Draft on November 26, 2008.

Wahl scored his first MLS goal, an impressive curling free-kick, on June 26, 2011 in a 2-1 Sounders win over New England Revolution. This won goal of the week for MLS.

Wahl was traded to MLS expansion side Montreal Impact for allocation money on November 23, 2011.

Wahl was traded to Colorado Rapids for an international roster spot on July 13, 2012.

Wahl was released by Colorado on November 16, 2012. He entered the 2012 MLS Re-Entry Draft and became a free agent after going undrafted in both rounds of the draft.

Wahl moved to his fifth MLS club on January 3, 2013 when he signed for Columbus Crew.

On September 27, 2016, Wahl announced his plans to retire at the end of the 2016 MLS season. He cited health concerns resulting from multiple concussions and the increased risk to his long term health associated with continuing to play.

International
In 2001, Wahl made an appearance for the United States U-17 national team in the FIFA U-17 World Championship.

Honors

Seattle Sounders FC
 Lamar Hunt U.S. Open Cup (3): 2009, 2010, 2011

Statistics
Sources:

References

External links
 
 

1984 births
Living people
All-American men's college soccer players
American soccer players
American expatriate soccer players
Association football defenders
California Golden Bears men's soccer players
Colorado Rapids players
Columbus Crew players
Expatriate soccer players in Canada
Major League Soccer players
CF Montréal players
Orange County Blue Star players
Seattle Sounders FC players
Soccer players from California
Sporting Kansas City draft picks
Sporting Kansas City players
Sportspeople from Newport Beach, California
United States men's youth international soccer players
USL League Two players
Newport Harbor High School alumni